Paul Merton in Galton and Simpson's... is a British comedy television show that ran from 26 January 1996 to 21 October 1997. It stars Paul Merton, re-performing a number of classic comedy scripts written by the duo Galton and Simpson (Ray Galton and Alan Simpson), including some originally written for Tony Hancock. The programme was produced by Central Independent Television for ITV, and aired for 15 episodes in two series.

Guest stars include Sam Kelly, Geoffrey Whitehead, Michael Fenton Stevens, Anne Reid, Jim Sweeney, Josie Lawrence, Roger Lloyd-Pack, Michael Jayston, Gary Waldhorn, Katy Carmichael, Brian Murphy, Adjoa Andoh, Matthew Ashforde, Al Ashton, John Baddeley, Patrick Barlow, Paul Bigley, James Bree, Owen Brenman, Dominic Brunt, Rob Brydon, Dennis Clinton, Emma Cunniffe, David Daker, Sheridan Forbes, David Hatton, Arif Hussein, Peter Jeffrey, Peter Jones, Phyllida Law, Rosemary Leach, Denis Lill, Nick Maloney, Geoffrey McGivern, Valerie Minifie, Guy Nicholls, Caroline Quentin, Jason Rose, Mike Sherman, Gwyneth Strong, Stella Tanner, Toni Palmer, Cliff Parisi, Harry Peacock, Nigel Peever, Jeffrey Perry, Nigel Planer and Louisa Rix. Most appear only in a single episode, although some appear in more than one episode playing different characters. Sam Kelly and Geoffrey Whitehead each appear in five episodes.

Episode guide

Series 1: 1996

Series 2: 1997

Home media
The Complete Series of Paul Merton in Galton and Simpson's… was released on DVD by Network on 25 June 2007.

References

External links

1990s British comedy television series
1996 British television series debuts
1997 British television series endings
ITV sitcoms
ITV comedy
Carlton Television
Television series by ITV Studios
Television shows produced by Central Independent Television
Television shows set in London
English-language television shows
Television series created by Ray Galton
Television series created by Alan Simpson